The 1934 Texas College Steers football team was an American football team that represented Texas College as a member of the Southwestern Athletic Conference (SWAC) during the 1934 college football season. Led by fourth-year head coach Ace Mumford, the team compiled an overall record of 94–0–1 record with a conference mark of 4–0–1, winning the SWAC title.

Schedule

References

Texas College
Texas College Steers football seasons
Southwestern Athletic Conference football champion seasons
College football undefeated seasons
Texas College Steers football